Adonis Jovon Filer (born July 11, 1993) is a Rwandan-American basketball player who plays for REG of the BAL. He also plays for the Rwanda national basketball team in International competitions.

Early life
Born and raised in Chicago, Filer attended Mount Carmel High School before transferring to the Bishop Noll Institute in Hammond, Indiana. He later also attended Notre Dame Preparatory School in Fitchburg, Massachusetts.

College career
Filer committed to the Clemson Tigers. In his rookie season, he averaged 10.0 points and 4.0 rebounds. After two years, he transferred from Clemson to Florida Atlantic.

Professional career
On September 14, 2017, Filer signed his first professional contract with Cypriot club Apollon Limassol. He was released before playing any official game with the team.

Filer then signed a contract for the 2018–19 season, with Beroe of the Bulgarian National Basketball League (NBL).

During the 2020–21 season, Filer played with the Patriots of the RNBL. After the season, his contract expired.
On June 8, 2021, Filer signed with REG. On March 8, 2022, he set a new BAL record for most assists in a game after racking up 14 assists in a win over AS Salé. The same season, he went on to win his second RBL title and was namemd to the All-RBL First Team a second year in a row.

In November 2022, Filer played with Urunani BBC in the Elite 16 of the 2023 BAL qualification. He returned to REG for the 2023 main season.

National team career
Filer was selected for the Rwanda national basketball team in 2020 and made his debut during the AfroBasket 2021 qualification.

Career statistics

College

|-
| 2012-13 || align=left |  Clemson || 31 || 4 || 19.9 || 0.37 || 0.313 || 0.675 || 2.3 || 1.5 || 0.7 || 0 || 6.3

|-
| 2013-14 || align=left |  Clemson || 35 || 4 || 14.7 || 0.333 || 0.297 || 0.794 || 1.3 || 1.2 || 0.7 || 0 || 3.9
|-
| 2014–15 || colspan=12 align=center | Transfer
|-
| 2015-16 || align=left | Florida Atlantic || 32 || 32 || 28.2 || 0.398 || 0.289 || 0.758 || 4.8 || 2.1 || 1 || 0.1 || 10.3
|-
| 2016-17 || align=left |  Florida Atlantic || 30 || 6 || 22.6 || 0.381 || 0.3 || 0.807 || 2.9 || 2.1 || 1 || 0 || 10.9
|-
| colspan=2 align=center|Career || 128 || 46 || 21.2 || 0.369 || 0.30 || 0.759 || 2.8 || 1.7 || 0.8 || 0.0 || 7.7
|}

BAL

|-
| style="text-align:left;"|2022
| style="text-align:left;"|REG
| 6 || 6 || 27.8 || .400 || .350 || .682 || 1.7 || 7.2 || 1.3 || 0.0 || 10.3
|-

Awards and accomplishments

Club
REG
2× Rwanda Basketball League: (2021, 2022)

References

External links
Adonis Filer on Proballers.com
Adonis Jovon Filer on RealGM

Living people
1993 births
Clemson Tigers men's basketball players
American men's basketball players
Rwandan men's basketball players
Patriots BBC players
REG BBC players
BC Beroe players
Point guards
Rwandan expatriate sportspeople in Burundi
Shooting guards
Sportspeople from Chicago
Florida Atlantic Owls men's basketball players
Urunani BBC players